Michaël Llodra and Fabrice Santoro were the defending champions, but they lost in quarterfinals 6–7(2), 5–7, against Jonas Björkman and Max Mirnyi.

Wayne Black and Kevin Ullyett defeated Bob Bryan and Mike Bryan 6–4, 6–4 in the final to win the men's doubles title.

Seeds

Draw

Finals

Top half

Section 1

Section 2

Bottom half

Section 3

Section 4

External links
 2005 Australian Open – Men's draws and results at the International Tennis Federation
 ATP Draw

Mens doubles
Australian Open (tennis) by year – Men's doubles